Extended Reach Drilling (ERD) is directional drilling of very long horizontal wells. The aims of ERD are: a) to reach a larger area from one surface drilling location, and b) to keep a well in a reservoir for a longer distance in order to maximize its productivity and drainage capability.

Today's challenges in ERD are hole cleaning, managing the mechanical loads on the drill string and managing downhole pressure. There is also the cost issue to consider.

Definition
Early ERD-well definitions related wells to those that exceeded some step-out/vertical-depth ratio (often 2:1). However, for most highly deviated wells in deepwater environments, this definition clearly does not fit. Some methods have evolved to categorize wells according to their stepout within different vertical-depth ranges. ERD wells then can be described conveniently as shallow, intermediate, deep, and ultradeep. Other variants are associated with operating in deep water and high-pressure/high-temperature environments. Currently, there is no generally accepted ERD-well definition.

What exactly determines a well to be "extended reach" varies over time and location with the development of technologies and of experiences. 
 On 24 April 2015 the world's longest borehole was drilled and completed from the Orlan Platform in the Chayvo Field, Sakhalin-1 Project with a total measured depth of 13,500 m (44,294 ft) and a horizontal displacement of 12,030 m (39,469 ft)
 The previous world record was drilled and completed 30 March 2014 by the Yastreb land drilling rig in the Chayvo Field, Sakhalin-1 Project to a total measured depth of 13,000 m (42,653 ft) and a horizontal displacement of 12,130 m (39,797 ft)

New developments and innovations

New technologies emerge that claims to be pushing the existing boundaries of ERD. One of these is the Reelwell Drilling Method, a drilling method solving problems for challenging wells, particularly suited for long reach wells. This innovation aims at multiplying the distance drilled by conventional ERD methods.

See also
Underbalanced drilling
Well drilling
Drilling fluid
Lost circulation

References

Drilling technology
Petroleum production